Ramsund Chapel is a chapel of the Church of Norway in Tjeldsund Municipality in Troms og Finnmark county, Norway. It is located in the village of Ramsund. It is an annex chapel in the Tjeldsund parish which is part of the Trondenes prosti (deanery) in the Diocese of Nord-Hålogaland. The white, wooden chapel was built in a long church style in 1964. The chapel seats about 250 people. The chapel was rebuilt in 1970 after a fire.

See also
List of churches in Nord-Hålogaland

References

Tjeldsund
Churches in Troms
Wooden churches in Norway
20th-century Church of Norway church buildings
Churches completed in 1964
1964 establishments in Norway
Long churches in Norway